Mayumi Hirase (born 30 October 1969) is a Japanese professional golfer who played on the LPGA of Japan Tour and the LPGA Tour.

Hirase won 18 times on the LPGA of Japan Tour between 1989 and 2000.

Hirase won once on the LPGA Tour in 1996.

Professional wins (19)

LPGA of Japan Tour (19)
1989 (3) Miyagi TV Cup Ladies Open, Ben Hogan & Itsuki Classic, JLPGA Lady Borden Cup
1990 (1) Fujisankei Ladies Classic
1991 (1) Marcoux Ladies 
1992 (1) Mitsubishi Electric Ladies
1993 (3) World Ladies Golf Tournament, Kose-Junon Women's Open, Fujitsu Ladies
1994 (4) NEC Karuizawa 72, Takara World Invitational, Daio Paper Elleair Women's Open, JLPGA Meiji Dairies Cup
1995 (3) Toto Motors Ladies, Dunlop Twin Lakes Ladies Open, NEC Karuizawa 72
1996 (1) Toray Japan Queens Cup (co-sanctioned with LPGA Tour)
1999 (1) Daio Paper Elleair Ladies Open
2000 (1) Fujisankei Ladies Classic
Tournament in bold denotes major championships in LPGA of Japan Tour.

LPGA Tour (1)

LPGA Tour playoff record (1–0)

References

External links

Japanese female golfers
LPGA of Japan Tour golfers
LPGA Tour golfers
People from Kumamoto Prefecture
1969 births
Living people
20th-century Japanese women